Disney Channel is a French private thematic television channel owned by The Walt Disney Company France.

The channel has been broadcast since March 22, 1997. It was free with ISPs from April 2011 to April 2020.

In 2013, Disney Channel had the largest audience share of thematic pay channels in France (0.8%), according to a study carried out by Médiamétrie.

History
The channel began on 22 March 1997 at 6:00pm (Paris Time), at its inception, was available on Canal Satellite at a price of 35 francs (around €5). The channel was ad-free since its launched.

On 2 November 2002, the portfolio of Disney-branded channels in France expanded from one to four channel with the launch of Toon Disney, Playhouse Disney (now Disney Junior), and Disney Channel +1. The movie channel Disney Cinemagic (now Disney Cinéma) was launched in September 2007.

After an announcement at the end of November 2006, four Disney channels were available in the Belgian television offer via ADSL Belgacom TV from 1 December 2006.

On October 23, 2007, the Conseil supérieur de l'audiovisuel pinned the various of channels of Disney in France for their programming in 2006. The CSA alerts Playhouse Disney to the lack of investment in French and independent audiovisual production. For Disney Channel, the CSA warns the channel for its lack of investment in independent individual production and puts it on notice regarding its prime-time broadcasting quotas.

On July 13, 2009, Walt Disney Television and NRJ 12 announced an agreement to broadcast Disney Channel exclusives on the NRJ12 channel from August 24, 2009. NRJ 12 will broadcast exclusively over-the-air series produced by Walt Disney Television and will be able to re-broadcast existing series after broadcast on Disney Channel such as The Suite Life of Zack and Cody, Wizards of Waverly Place and Sonny with a Chance.

On 1 April 2011, the channel was launched on IPTV platforms. On 19 April 2011, Disney and Free ISP launched a VOD service on Freebox called Disneytek. On 1 May 2011 the channel rebranded its graphical package. On August 24, 2011, Disney Channel and Disney Channel +1 switched to 16:9 format, taking the opportunity to put on a new logo. in September 20, 2011, Disney Channel has its own high-definition version.

Since January 2, 2012, it has been the most watched cable/satellite channel with 1.1% (including Disney Channel +1). It is the most watched youth channel.

On June 29, 2015, the channel ceased to be offered to Belgians, replaced by a new Belgian version, which have a French and Dutch speaking version.

The channel had a programming block, Les Grandes histoires de Disney Junior (lit. The Great Stories of Disney Junior), and from 2015 of the Disney XD Zone. The programs of these two channels were only diffused there in their block. The programming blocks disappeared in June 2016.

Disney Channel celebrates its 20th anniversary in France from January to March 2017, notably with the film, Mère et Fille: California Dream, a French Disney Channel Original Movie.

In parallel with the French launch of Disney+ scheduled for March 24, 2020, but postponed to April 7, Disney XD, Disney Cinema and three services (Disney Channel Pop Pick, Disney English and Hola Disney) were shut down, and Disney Channel became back a Canal+ exclusive, being removed of Bouygues Telecom on March 30, Free on April 2, Orange on April 9 and finally SFR on June 30.

Visual identity (logo)

Slogans 

 « La télé bien allumée » (What is on TV) (1997-1999)
 « L'Imaginachaine » (The Imagination Channel) (1999-2003)
 « Fais le plein de fun, fais le plein de Disney Channel » (Fill up on fun, fill up on Disney Channel) (2013-2016)
 « Les émotions sont faites pour être partagées, partages les sur Disney Channel » (The emotions are meant to be shared, share them on Disney Channel) (since 2016)

Programming
The channel broadcasts all Disney movies and series, and rebroadcast them several times a year from 6 a.m. to 11 p.m.

The channel's programming often varied between Disney live-action movies and series and Disney animated movies and series, but generally, the programming of Disney films and live-action series and Disney films and animated series was more accentuated on Tuesday evenings, Wednesdays and Weekends.

Programming blocks

Current programming blocks 

 Les Nouvelles Héroïnes (The New Heroines) (since 2017)
 Toon Story (since 2017)
 We Love Family (since 2019)
 Trop School (Too School or Too Much School) (since 2020)
 Disney Channel Party (since 2020)
 Tous avec Miraculous (All with Miraculous) (since 2020)

Former programming blocks

References

External links 
 Official website
  DisneyChannelFR
  DisneyChannelFR
  DisneyChannelFR

France
Children's television networks
Television stations in France
Television stations in Switzerland
French-language television stations
French-language television in Switzerland
Television channels and stations established in 1997
1997 establishments in France